Klinaklini Canyon is a canyon on the Klinaklini River in the Pacific Ranges of the Coast Mountains in British Columbia, Canada, located to the north of the head of Knight Inlet in the river's lowermost reaches, upstream from the confluence of the West Klinaklini River.

References

Canyons and gorges of British Columbia
Pacific Ranges
Central Coast of British Columbia